Eublemmodes is a monotypic snout moth genus. It was described by Max Gaede in 1917, and is known from Cameroon. It contains the species Eublemmodes contumacialis.

This species has a wingspan of 17–18 mm.

References

Epipaschiinae
Monotypic moth genera
Moths of Africa
Pyralidae genera